The 2014 Algerian Super Cup is the  8th edition of Algerian Super Cup, a football match contested by the winners of the Ligue 1 and 2013–14 Algerian Cup competitions. The match was scheduled to be played on 9 August 2014 at Stade Mustapha Tchaker in Blida between 2013-14 Ligue 1 winners USM Alger and 2013–14 Algerian Cup winners MC Alger.

Match details

References 

2014
USM Alger matches
Supercup